Baba Gangeshwarnath Dham is a temple in Itahara Uparwar village, Sant Ravidas Nagar district, Uttar Pradesh.

History 

Almost 250 years ago With help from Kashi Naresh the Temple made by Shiv Lal Singh.

References

Shiva temples in Uttar Pradesh
Hindu temples in Uttar Pradesh
Bhadohi district